Camilo Doval (born July 4, 1997) is a Dominican professional baseball relief pitcher for the San Francisco Giants of Major League Baseball (MLB). He signed with the Giants as a free agent in 2015, and made his MLB debut with them in 2021. His fastball has reached .

Early life
Doval was born in Yamasá, in the Dominican Republic. His parents are Rosa, an elementary school teacher, and Sergio, a farmer, who have separated. He is the third of Rosa's four children, and has a combined 23 siblings and half-siblings, with whom he communicates often in a group chat on Whatsapp. He has a son who was one year old in October 2021, Lian.

Professional career

Minor leagues
Doval signed with the San Francisco Giants as an international free agent at 18 years of age in October 2015, for a signing bonus of $100,000, as a shortstop. In 2016 as a pitcher he had a 2–0 win–loss record with one save and a 1.66 earned run average (ERA) for the Rookie-level DSL Giants in the Dominican Summer League. In 2017 he was 1–2 with one save and a 3.90 ERA, and had 14.2 strikeouts per 9 innings (2nd in the Arizona League) for the Rookie-level AZL Giants. 

In 2018 he was 0–3 with a 3.06 ERA and had 11 saves (5th in the South Atlantic League) in 44 games (2nd), as he struck out 13.2 batters per 9 innings (3rd).  Doval was a 2018 MiLB.com Organization All-Star, pitching for the Class A Augusta Greenjackets. In 2019 he was 3–5 with a 3.83 ERA in 45 relief appearances (3rd in the league) for the Class A-Advanced San Jose Giants, as he allowed only 6.6 hits per 9 innings and struck out 12.8 batters per 9 innings. He was a 2019 California League Mid-Season All-Star. Doval averaged 12.8 strikeouts per 9 innings in his first four minor league seasons.

Doval did not play in 2020 due to the cancellation of the Minor League Baseball season because of the COVID-19 pandemic. The Giants added him to their 40-man roster after the 2020 season.

He split 2021 between the Triple-A West Sacramento River Cats and the major league Giants. In July, pitching for the River Cats, Doval  threw a pitch that was timed at 104.5 mph. For the 2021 season for the River Cats, he was 3–0 with one save and a 4.99 ERA, and averaged 12.9 strikeouts per 9 innings over 28 relief appearances covering 30.2 innings.

San Francisco Giants

2021
On April 16, 2021, Doval was promoted to the major leagues for the first time. He made his MLB debut at 23 years of age on April 18, pitching a scoreless inning of relief with 2 strikeouts against the Miami Marlins. 

In September 2021 he became the second Giants pitcher since Statcast started tracking in 2008 to throw a pitch faster than 102 mph, joining Brian Wilson. That same month, he became the youngest Giants pitcher, at 24 years and three months old, to record a save since Rod Beck in 1992. Doval was named the National League Reliever of the Month for September/October after throwing 14.1 scoreless innings. He struck out 20 and walked only three batters in those appearances, and by the end was serving as the team's closer.

In the 2021 regular season with the Giants, Doval was 5–1 with three saves and a 3.00 ERA. In 29 relief appearance he pitched 27 innings in which he struck out 37 batters, averaging 6.3 hits and 12.3 strikeouts per 9 innings with a 1.037 WHIP. His average fastball velocity of 98.6 mph was in the fastest 1% in MLB.

In the post-season, Doval threw a scoreless ninth inning against the Los Angeles Dodgers in a 4–0 win in Game 1 of the 2021 National League Division Series. He next pitched two perfect innings to save the Giants 1–0 win over the Dodgers in Game 3 of the NLDS. He became the first rookie to have a two-plus inning save in the postseason without allowing a baserunner since saves became an official statistic in 1969. It extended his scoreless streak to 19.1 innings, in which he allowed 8 hits, walked 3, and struck out 25.

2022
The 2022 season was Doval's first full season in the major leagues, and his first full season as the Giants' closer. He was 6–6 with 27 saves (6th in the NL) in 30 save opportunities, a 2.53 ERA in 68 relief appearances (6th) and 51 games finished (2nd), and in 67.2 innings struck out 80 batters.  His average fastball velocity of 99 mph was in the fastest 1% in MLB.

His four-seam fastball reaches 104 mph, and he also throws a high-80s hard slider and an occasional change-up. In the middle of the 2022 season, Doval added a sinker averaging in the high-90s to his pitch repotoire. He throws from a very low, nearly sidearm arm slot. He relied primarily on his 88 mph slider (against which batters hit .154), 99 mph cutter, and 98 mph sinker. 

He was again named the NL Reliever of the Month for September.

References

External links

1997 births
Living people
Major League Baseball players from the Dominican Republic
Major League Baseball pitchers
San Francisco Giants players
San Jose Giants players
Augusta GreenJackets players
Dominican Summer League Giants players
Arizona League Giants players
Sacramento River Cats players
2023 World Baseball Classic players